Mark Lee Keam (born May 10, 1966) is a Korean American lawyer. He is a former member of the Virginia House of Delegates in the United States. A Democrat, Keam represented the 35th District, which encompassed a portion of Fairfax County, including the town of Vienna, Virginia, where he resides. He resigned his seat on September 6, 2022 to take a position in the Biden administration.

Keam was born in Seoul, South Korea and has lived in Vietnam, Australia, and California. He was formerly an aide on Capitol Hill, and was an executive with Verizon Communications until he left in 2009 to run for the Virginia General Assembly.

Early life 
Keam was born to a Presbyterian minister in Seoul, South Korea, in 1966. His family later founded a church in Vietnam, before fleeing when the country became communist in 1975. After arriving in Australia, Keam and his brother attended Newington College while their father was founding pastor of the Korean parish of the Uniting Church in Australia at Strathfield, New South Wales. The family eventually settled in Orange County, California. To help support his family, Keam worked odd jobs, from construction to collecting shopping carts in a retail parking lot. He earned a degree in political science from the University of California, Irvine, and later earned a law degree from the Hastings College of the Law.

Keam served as Senator Richard Durbin's chief counsel on the Senate Judiciary Committee from 2001 to 2007, when he left to join Verizon Communications as a Vice President and Counsel. In 2009, he took an unpaid leave of absence to run for the Virginia General Assembly.

House of Delegates 
In 2009, Delegate Steve Shannon, the Democratic incumbent, did not seek reelection in the 35th district in order to run (unsuccessfully) for Attorney General of Virginia. Keam declared his intention to run for the seat. On Election day Mark Keam defeated Republican challenger James E. Hyland, making Keam the first Asian-born immigrant and the first Korean American elected to any state-level office in Virginia. He was sworn into office on January 13, 2010 at the State Capitol in Richmond, Virginia.

In February 2010, Keam and fellow freshman delegate James LeMunyon, a Republican, authored an op-ed in The Washington Post about their introduction of a bill to the General Assembly, which would attempt to make the voting records of General Assembly members more accessible to the public. The bill passed the House of Delegates 86 to 13 later that month. A State Senate committee carried the bill over for a year, and it has not yet been voted on.

He told a local newspaper in his district in January 2010 that he can legislate from an immigrant's point of view; saying that "I want to be able to speak on issues where people say, ‘I’ve never met an immigrant in my life; I don’t know what you guys think about it,’... I want to be able to say, ‘Well, let me tell you what they think about it.’" He has also sponsored another bill which would raise the number of ESL, or "English as a second language" teachers in Virginia’s schools from 17 full-time positions to 30 full-time positions for every 1,000 students.

Keam said in 2010 that he would abstain from voting on any bill which would pose a conflict of interest due to him being on an unpaid leave of absence from Verizon Communications, and he would not introduce any telecommunications legislation to the House of Delegates.

Keam was re-elected to his seat in Virginia’s House of Delegates on November 7, 2017.

In 2021, Keam co-founded the General Assembly's first Asian American and Pacific Islander Caucus.

Committee assignments 
Keam has served on the House committees on Agriculture, Chesapeake and Natural Resources (2012–); Education (2012–); Finance (2010–); and Militia, Police and Public Safety (2010–2011).

Electoral history 

Despite the landslide victory of Republican gubernatorial candidate Bob McDonnell in the 2009 Governor's race, James Hyland was not able to take advantage of McDonnell's victory and was defeated by only 350 votes.

References

External links 
 Mark Keam website
 Virginia House of Delegates official Bio
 

1966 births
Living people
Democratic Party members of the Virginia House of Delegates
South Korean emigrants to the United States
People from Orange County, California
People educated at Newington College
University of California, Irvine alumni
University of California, Hastings College of the Law alumni
People from Seoul
Virginia lawyers
People from Vienna, Virginia
American politicians of Korean descent
Asian-American people in Virginia politics
South Korean expatriates in Australia
South Korean expatriates in Vietnam
Verizon Communications people
Corporate executives
21st-century American politicians